The Church of St. Ann, Church of Saint Anne, St. Ann's Church, St. Anne's Church, St. Anne's Roman Catholic Church or variations may refer to:

Albania
St. Anne's Church, Derviçan

Belgium
Church of Saint Anne, Aldeneik

Canada
 St. Anne's Chapel (Fredericton), New Brunswick
 Ste-Anne Catholic Church (Ottawa), Ontario
 St. Anne's Anglican Church, Toronto, Ontario
 Basilica of Sainte-Anne-de-Beaupré, Quebec City, Quebec
 Sainte-Anne de Varennes Basilica, Varennes, Quebec

Denmark
St. Anne's Church, Copenhagen

Germany
St. Anne's Church, Augsburg

Holy Land
Church of Saint Anne, Jerusalem, the traditional birthplace of Mary, mother of Jesus, in the house of her parents, Joachim and Saint Anne

Hungary
Saint Anne Parish, Budapest
St. Anne's Church, Miskolc

India
 Church of St. Anne, Talaulim

Italy
 Church of Saint Anne (Alcamo)

Lithuania
Church of St. Anne, Vilnius

Malaysia
 St. Anne's Church, Bukit Mertajam, Penang

Malta
St Anne's Chapel, Qrendi

Poland
St. Anne's Church, Warsaw
Saint Anne Church, Wrocław

Republic of Ireland
St. Anne's Church, Ardclough, County Kildare
St. Ann's Church, Dawson Street, Dublin
Church of St Anne, Shandon, Cork

Russia
Annenkirche, Saint Petersburg (St. Ann's Church)

Singapore
St. Anne's Church, Singapore, a Catholic church in Sengkang

United Kingdom

England

Old St Ann's Church, Warrington, Cheshire
St Anne's Church, Hessenford, Cornwall
St Anne's Church, Thwaites, Cumbria
St Ann's Church, Manchester, Greater Manchester
St Ann's, Stretford, Greater Manchester
St Anne's Church, Haughton, Greater Manchester
St Anne's Church, Hindsford, Greater Manchester
St Wilfrid and St Ann's Church, Newton Heath, Greater Manchester
St Ann's Church, HMNB Portsmouth, Hampshire
St Anne's Church, Blackburn, Lancashire
St Anne's Church, Singleton, Lancashire
St Anne's Church, St Anne's-on-the-Sea, Lancashire
St Anne's Church, Turton, Lancashire
St Anne's Church, Woodplumpton, Lancashire
St Ann Blackfriars, London
St Ann's Church, South Tottenham, London
St Anne and St Agnes, London
St Anne's Church, Kew, London
St Anne's Limehouse, London
St Anne's Church, Soho, London
Church of St Anne, Aigburth, Merseyside
St Anne's Church, Edge Hill, Merseyside
St Anne's Church, Rock Ferry, Merseyside
St Anne's Church, Birmingham, West Midlands
St Anne's Church, Moseley, West Midlands
St Ann with Emmanuel, Nottingham, Nottinghamshire
St Ann's Church, Nottingham, a church demolished in 1971
St Anne's Church, Sutton Bonington, Nottinghamshire
Church of St Anne, Catterick, North Yorkshire
St Anne's Church, Brown Edge, Staffordshire
St Anne's Cathedral, Leeds (Leeds Cathedral), West Yorkshire

Northern Ireland
St Anne's Cathedral, Belfast

Wales
St Anne's Church, Cefn Hengoed, Caerphilly borough. Defunct
St Anne's Church, Roath, Cardiff. Defunct
St Anne's Church, Ynyshir, Rhondda Cynon Taf. Active

United States
(by state, then city)
St. Ann Church (Bridgeport, Connecticut)
Saint Anne Church (Waterbury, CT)
St. Anne's Episcopal Church (Middletown, Delaware) (Old St. Anne's Church), listed on the National Register of Historic Places (NRHP)
Saint Ann Catholic Church (Kaneohe, Hawaii)
St. Anne Catholic Community (Barrington, Illinois)
Church of St. Anne (Allen, Louisiana), NRHP-listed
St. Anne's Church and Mission Site, Old Town, Maine, NRHP-listed
St. Anne's Church (Annapolis, Maryland)
Chapel of St. Anne (Arlington, Massachusetts), NRHP-listed
St. Anne's Church and Parish Complex (Fall River, Massachusetts), NRHP-listed
Ste. Anne de Detroit Catholic Church, Detroit, Michigan
Sainte Anne Church (Mackinac Island), Michigan
St. Anne Church (Berlin, New Hampshire), NRHP-listed
St. Ann's Episcopal Church (Bronx), New York, NRHP-listed
St. Ann & the Holy Trinity Church, Brooklyn, New York
St. Ann Church (East Harlem), New York
St. Ann's Federation Building, Hornell, New York, NRHP-listed
St. Ann Church (Manhattan), New York
St. Ann Roman Catholic Church Complex, Toledo, Ohio, NRHP-listed
Saint Anne Church (Philadelphia), Pennsylvania
St. Ann's Church Complex (Woonsocket, Rhode Island), NRHP-listed
St. Ann's Catholic Church of Badus, Ramona, South Dakota, NRHP-listed
Kearns-St. Ann's Orphanage, Salt Lake City, Utah, NRHP-listed
Glebe House of St. Anne's Parish, Champlain, Virginia, NRHP-listed
St. Anne's Roman Catholic Church (Marysville, Washington), NRHP-listed
St. Anne Chapel, Frenchtown, US Virgin Islands
St. Ann Catholic Parish (Stoughton, Wisconsin), part of the Roman Catholic Diocese of Madison

Vatican
Sant'Anna dei Palafrenieri (Church of Saint Anne in the Vatican)

See also
St Anne's Cathedral (disambiguation)
St. Ann's Episcopal Church (disambiguation)
Small Church of Saint Anne (disambiguation)
Saint Anne (disambiguation)
St Ann's (disambiguation)